Rippin' & Runnin is an album by American jazz saxophonist Johnny Hodges featuring performances recorded in 1968 and released on the Verve label.

Track listing
 "Cue Time" (Edith Cue Hodges) – 4:53
 "Rio Segundo" (Johnny Hodges) – 3:23
 "Jeep Bounces Back" (Edith Cue Hodges) – 5:50
 "Rippin' and Runnin'" (Tom McIntosh) – 4:13
 "Touch Love" (Alonzo Levister) – 4:00
 "Tell Everybody's Children" (McIntosh) – 8:23
 "Moonflower" (Don Sebesky) – 3:10

Personnel
Johnny Hodges – alto saxophone
Willie Gardner – organ
Jimmy Ponder – guitar
Ron Carter – bass
Freddie Waits – drums

References

Johnny Hodges albums
1969 albums
Albums produced by Esmond Edwards
Verve Records albums